Rich Hill is a summit in Knox County, Ohio, in the United States.

An ancient cairn once stood at the top of Rich Hill until its stones were salvaged by early settlers.

References

Landforms of Knox County, Ohio
Mountains of Ohio